The Roman Catholic Diocese of Morondava is a suffragan Latin diocese in the Ecclesiastical province of Toliara (one of five in Madagascar), yet depends on the missionary Roman Congregation for the Evangelization of Peoples.

Its cathedral episcopal see is the (Marian) Cathédrale Maria Manjaka Namahora, in the city of Morondava, Toliara province.

Statistics 
As per 2014, it pastorally served 54,895 Catholics (9.8% of 560,000 total) on 45,200 km2 in 17 parishes and 26 missions with 42 priests (8 diocesan, 34 religious), 156 lay religious (39 brothers, 117 sisters) and 20 seminarians.

History 
 Established on January 8, 1938 as Apostolic Prefecture of Morondava, on territories split off from the then Apostolic Vicariate of Fianarantsoa, Apostolic Vicariate of Majunga and Apostolic Vicariate of Tananarive
 On 1939.03.15 it gained territory from Mission sui juris of Miarinarivo.
 Promoted on September 14, 1955 as Diocese of Morondava
 Lost territories, twice : on 1960.04.25 to establish the Diocese of Morombe and on 2017.02.08 (with two other sees) to establish Diocese of Maintirano.

Ordinaries 
(all Roman rite, so far -mostly European missionary- members of Latin congregations)

Apostolic Prefects of Morondava  
 Father Joseph-Paul Futy, LaSalette Missionaries (M.S.) (born France) (1938 – 1947.02.13); later Titular Bishop of Aspendus (1947.02.13 – death 1956.08.12) as Apostolic Vicar of Antsirabe (Madagascar) (1947.02.13 – retired 1955.03)
 Father Stefano Garon, M.S. (1947.07.04 – death 1954)
 Father Paul J. Girouard, M.S. (born USA) (1954 – 1955.09.14 see below).

 Suffragan Bishops of Morondava 
 Paul J. Girouard, M.S. (see above 1955.09.14 – death 1964.02.18)
 Bernard Charles Ratsimamotoana, M.S. (1964.09.29 – retired 1998.08.08), died 2005
 Donald Joseph Leo Pelletier, M.S. (born USA) (1999.10.15 - retired 2010.02.26)
 Marie Fabien Raharilamboniaina, Teresian Carmelites (O.C.D.) (2010.02.26 - ...), also Vice-President of Episcopal Conference of Madagascar (2012? – ...).

See also 
 List of Roman Catholic dioceses in Madagascar
 Roman Catholicism in Madagascar

Sources and external links 
 GCatholic.org
 Catholic Hierarchy

Roman Catholic dioceses in Madagascar
Christian organizations established in 1938
Roman Catholic dioceses and prelatures established in the 20th century
1938 establishments in Madagascar
Roman Catholic Ecclesiastical Province of Toliara